Epilobium septentrionale, with the common names Humboldt County fuchsia and northern willowherb, is a species of willowherb. Like the wildflower zauschneria, this plant was once treated as a member of genus Zauschneria but has more recently been placed with the willowherbs.

Distribution
This species is endemic to Northern California, where it is an uncommon resident of the rocky ledges of the Northern Outer California Coast Ranges.

Description 
Epilobium septentrionale is a squat, clumpy perennial growing in thin patches of soil between rocks and sending up a few erect stems. The leaves are oval and pointed, glandular, and covered in a coat of white fuzz.

At the end of each erect branch is a glandular inflorescence bearing a bright red-orange tubular flower 2 or 3 centimeters long. A bunch of stamens and one long pistil protrude obviously from the mouth of the bloom, which is pollinated by nectar-feeding birds. The fruit is a hairy capsule about two centimeters long.

References

External links
Jepson Manual Treatment - Epilobium septentrionale
Epilobium septentrionale - Photo gallery

septentrionale
Endemic flora of California
Natural history of the California chaparral and woodlands
Natural history of the California Coast Ranges
Flora without expected TNC conservation status